Counterfeit Blues is an album by Corb Lund and the Hurtin' Albertans. It was released in Canada on June 17, 2014 via New West Records and in the United States on July 1. The album was recorded live at Sun Studio in Memphis, Tennessee and features re-cut songs from previous albums. It was originally recorded for a TV special for CMT in Canada. A two-disc CD/DVD set featuring the CMT documentary Memphis Sun with three bonus tracks was also released.

Critical reception
Thom Jurek of AllMusic gave the album four stars out of five, writing that "the band deliver a kinetic, tightrope-without-a-net walking set where new versions stand in stark contrast to originals." Kayla Tinson of Top Country gave the album four and a half stars out of five, calling it "'raw, organic and dirty' in the best possible way." Sarah Greene of NOW gave the album a favorable review, stating that "Lund's best writing is old-fashioned and suits that old-school recording style." Stuart Munro of The Boston Globe also reviewed the album favorably, writing that "it argues for just how good Lund's evocative, regionally rooted songs are, no matter their rendition." Dustin Blumhagen of Country Standard Time gave the album a positive review as well, calling it "a raw recording with a live feel that showcases the extremely talented musicians that make up his band, the Hurtin' Albertans" and "a great gift for long time fans."

Track listing

References

2014 albums
Corb Lund and the Hurtin' Albertans albums
New West Records albums